Włodzimierz Wojciechowski (born 12 January 1948) is a Polish footballer. He played in three matches for the Poland national football team from 1972 to 1973.

References

External links
 

1948 births
Living people
Polish footballers
Poland international footballers
Place of birth missing (living people)
Association footballers not categorized by position